The Institute of Singapore Chartered Accountants (ISCA) is the national accountancy body of Singapore. It was established in 1963 and has over 33,000 members.

Registration of public accountant
Currently, the Singapore Public Accountants Oversight Committee (PAOC) of the Accounting and Corporate Regulatory Authority, established under the Accountants Act to determine, prescribe and review the requirements to be satisfied by people seeking to be registered as public accountants in Singapore, will not register any person as a public accountant unless the person is a member of ISCA.

Global Accountancy Hub
The Singapore Government has plans to develop Singapore into a global accountancy hub, as outlined in recommendations by the Committee to Develop the Accountancy Sector (CDAS). With the Ministry of Finance having approved CDAS' recommendations, plans are underway for ISCA to transform into a global professional accountancy body. ISCA shall also be administering a post-graduate accountancy qualification programme that shall connote global recognition, international portability and an “Asian market value factor”. As the accountancy sector continues to develop, ISCA shall provide the support that will propel Singapore's growth as a global accountancy hub.

International Links
ISCA is a member body of the following international or regional organisations:
 Asean Federation of Accountants (AFA) 
 Asia Oceania Tax Consultants' Association (AOTCA) 
 INSOL International (International Association of Restructuring, Insolvency & Bankruptcy Professionals)
 International Accounting Standards Board (IASB)
 International Federation of Accountants (IFAC)
 Chartered Accountants Worldwide 
 International Innovation Network 
 INSOL International

References

Professional associations based in Singapore
1963 establishments in Singapore
Member bodies of the International Federation of Accountants